A list of British films released in 1934.

A-L

M-Z

See also
 1934 in British music
 1934 in British television
 1934 in the United Kingdom

References

External links
 

1934
Films
Lists of 1934 films by country or language
1930s in British cinema